Bodyhold is a 1949 American crime film noir sport film directed by Seymour Friedman and starring Willard Parker, Lola Albright, and Hillary Brooke.

Premise
Tommy Jones, a well-built plumber, is invited to join a troupe of wrestlers, but is surprised to learn that the sport of exhibition wrestling is not on the up-on-up.

Cast
 Willard Parker as Tommy Jones
 Lola Albright as Mary Simmons
 Hillary Brooke as Flo Woodbury
 Allen Jenkins as Slats Henry
 Roy Roberts as Charlie Webster
 Gordon Jones as Pat Simmons
 John Dehner as Sir Raphael Brokenridge

Reception
The New York Times called it a "dim saga".

References

External links

Bodyhold at BFI

1949 films
American black-and-white films
Columbia Pictures films
Films directed by Seymour Friedman
American crime drama films
1949 crime drama films
1940s English-language films
1940s American films